Robert Frost (born 1793) was an English first-class cricketer who played for Norfolk in one match in 1820, totalling 13 runs with a highest score of 10.

References

Bibliography
 

English cricketers
English cricketers of 1787 to 1825
Norfolk cricketers
1793 births
Year of death unknown
People from North Elmham
Sportspeople from Norfolk